Trostianets is an urban settlement (town) in Vinnytsia Oblast (province), Ukraine, located in the historic region of Podilia. It was formerly the administrative seat of Trostianets Raion, but is now administered within Haisyn Raion. The town is located on the Trostianets River, which is a tributary of the Southern Bug.

History 
Trostianets was first mentioned in 1598. Historically, it was known as Adamhorod (Adamgrod), and was a private town in Poland, located in the Bracław Voivodeship, owned by the House of Potocki.

Born in Trostianets 
Mendel Osherowitch - Jewish journalist and writer, a witness of Holodomor.

External links
 Trostianets at the Ukrainian Soviet Encyclopedia
 Trostianets at the Verkhovna Rada website
 Trostianets

Urban-type settlements in Haisyn Raion
Bratslavsky Uyezd